International Conference on Interactive Computer Aided Learning (ICL) is an annual International Association of Online Engineering (IAOE) conference.

ICL is a conference covering topics on interactive computer aided learning. ICL is an interdisciplinary conference focusing on the exchange of relevant trends and research results as well as the presentation of practical experiences gained while developing and testing elements of interactive computer aided learning. This conference is annually organized by the Carinthia University of Applied Sciences in Villach Austria in cooperation with a number of organizations and groups.

ICL was started in 1998 by Michael E. Auer. It operates under the auspices of the International Association of Online Engineering (IAOE).

External links
Official website

Computer science conferences